Mark Andrew Lollo (born March 31, 1982) is a former American professional baseball umpire who resides in New Lexington, OH. Before joining the Professional Baseball Umpire Corp. staff as a Minor League field evaluator/instructor in April 2014, Lollo worked as an umpire in the International League and served as a reserve umpire for Major League Baseball. He made his MLB debut on July 2, 2011.

Early career
Prior to his post in the International League, Lollo served in the Gulf Coast, New York-Penn, Florida Instructional, South Atlantic, Carolina, Florida State, Texas, Eastern and Arizona Fall Leagues. He was the plate umpire for the 2012 Triple-A All-Star Game.

In 2008, Lollo umpired in the MLB Home Run Derby and MiLB Future's Game.

See also 

 List of Major League Baseball umpires

References

1982 births
Living people
Major League Baseball umpires
Sportspeople from Mansfield, Ohio
People from New Lexington, Ohio